Skyphone is a Danish electronica trio consisting of Mads Bødker, Keld Dam Schmidt, and Thomas Holst. Their first album Fabula was released in 2004 on the acclaimed Norwegian label Rune Grammofon. A 55 minute concert from the Swedish Norberg Festival was broadcast by the Swedish National Radio in 2005. The Wire magazine wrote:

"Caught between the spacious glacial excursions of the northern Scandinavians (Sigur Rós and Supersilent) and the infinite digital strands of microtechnological exploration occurring in Germany to the south, a new generation of Danish musicians (Under Byen, Efterklang) is now fusing influences from both directions with fresh, creative assurance. Skyphone can be considered among the frontrunners. This is their debut album but the trio's collective background in rock, dub and electronica has been an invaluable apprenticeship, as Skyphone combine these elements into a confident and convincingly distinctive hybrid. Fabula offers up diffident melodies conjured from acoustic guitars and analogue synths, crisply fluctuating digital percussion, feathery skeins of sampled texture and a wonderfully, almost fairytale sense of immersion" (The Wire, April 2004)

Skyphone was nominated in the category "best band" at the Danish "Steppeulv" awards (music journalist awards) in 2004.

In 2008, Skyphone released their second album "Avellaneda". In 2019 the band released two new albums (Hildur and Marsh Drones) on the US label Lost Tribe Sound.

Releases 

Fabula (Rune Grammofon) 

Fabula (Japanese) (Rune Grammofon/Bomba Records)

Avellaneda (Rune Grammofon)

Hildur (Lost Tribe Sound) 

Marsh Drones (Lost Tribe Sound)

Compilations 

Track: "Seaweed" on Rump Comp (Rump Recordings 2005)

Track: "In Our Time" on Snowdrop (Fueradeserie)

Track: "fstop" on t'ump3 webcompilation

External links
skyphone.bandcamp  (official site)
skyphone Flickr  (official photos)

Danish musical groups
Rune Grammofon artists